Alessandro De Rose (born July 2, 1992) is an Italian high diver. 

De Rose was born in Cosenza, Italy. He competed for Italy at the 2015 World Aquatics Championships in Kazan.

On 23 July 2017 De Rose won the men's title at Italian stop of the Red Bull Cliff Diving World Series which was held at Polignano a Mare in Puglia.

In December 2021, at the Abu Dhabi Aquatics Festival, held in Abu Dhabi, United Arab Emirates, De Rose placed sixth in the 27 metre high dive with a score of 398.45 points.

At the 2022 European Aquatics Championships, held in Rome in August, De Rose won the bronze medal in the high dive event (27 metre), with a score of 416.45 points, which was 39.25 points behind the score of 455.70 points by gold medalist Constantin Popovici of Romania, 19.75 points behind silver medalist Cătălin Preda of Romania, and 14.90 points ahead of fourth-place finisher Gary Hunt of France.

References

External links
Alessandro De Rose at Federnuoto

Sportspeople from Cosenza
Living people
Male high divers
Italian male divers
1992 births
World Aquatics Championships medalists in high diving
20th-century Italian people
21st-century Italian people